The Guam general election for 2018 was held in Guam on Tuesday, November 6, 2018. Voters in Guam chose their governor, their non-voting delegate to the United States House of Representatives, attorney general, public auditor, as well as all fifteen members of the territorial legislature. The election coincides with the United States mid-term elections.

Governor of Guam

Incumbent Republican Governor Eddie Baza Calvo is barred from re-election, after his win in 2014, since Guam does not allow governors more than 2 consecutive terms. Five candidates have officially declared their bids to be the next Governor of Guam: 
Incumbent Lieutenant Governor Ray Tenorio
Senator Frank B. Aguon, 24th-33rd, currently serving in the 34th Guam Legislature
Former Senator Lou Leon Guerrero, 23rd-24th, 26th-28th Guam Legislature

Primary Elections
A primary election was held to determine each party's gubernatorial candidates.

Democratic primary results
Four gubernatorial tickets faced off in the Democratic primaries. The Democratic ticket of Leon Guerrero/Tenorio received the highest number of votes and will move on to challenge the Republican Tenorio/Ada ticket in November.

Republican primary results
The Tenorio/Ada ticket was unopposed for the Republican primaries and will move on to the general election

General Election Results

United States House of Representatives 

Democratic candidate Michael San Nicolas attained nearly 55% of the total votes against Republican challenger Doris Flores Brookes, who attained 43.98%. San Nicolas will be Guam's 5th delegate to the United States House of Representatives.

Primary Elections

Democratic primary results
Incumbent delegate Madeleine Bordallo and senator Michael San Nicolas will face off in the Democratic primaries.

Republican primary results
One Republican has declared their bid for Guam's delegate seat in the United States House of Representatives. Former public auditor Doris Flores-Brooks recently resigned from her post to run for Guam's congressional seat.

General Election Results

Attorney General 
Incumbent Elizabeth Barrett-Anderson would not run for re-election as Guam's elected attorney general. Three candidates are vying for the non-partisan position: former Democratic lieutenant governor candidate Gary Gumataotao, first elected attorney general Douglas Moylan, and attorney Leevin Camacho. The top two moved on from the blanket primary to the general election.

Primary results

General Election Results

Public Auditor 
Guam's first elected non-partisan public auditor Doris Flores Brookes was elected to her fourth term in 2016. Flores Brookes recently resigned from her post to run for Guam's delegate seat in the U.S. House of Representatives. Three candidate have declared their bid in the special election to be Guam's next public auditor: professor Doreen Crisostomo, incumbent speaker Benjamin Cruz, and acting public auditor Yukari Hechanova. Hachanova withdrew prior to the election, though her name remained on the ballot. Incumbent speaker Benjamin Cruz was elected as Guam's next public auditor after a special election was held coinciding with the August 25 primaries.

Special election results

Legislature of Guam 

All fifteen seats in the Legislature of Guam are up for election. Democrats, under Speaker Benjamin Cruz, currently control nine seats in the Legislature, while Republicans hold six seats.
Six incumbent seats are up for grabs with two senators seeking the gubernatorial seat, one seeking the delegate to the United States House of Representatives seat, and three senators not seeking re-election to the 35th Guam Legislature.

Consolidated Commission on Utilities 
Two incumbent Simon A. Sanchez II and Francis E. Santos are running for re-election and one incumbent Joseph George Bamba will not run for re-election as Guam elected CCU. Two candidates are vying for the non-partisan position: former Republican senator Michael Limtiaco, and former senatorial candidate William Parkinson are both running.

General Election Results

Education Board 
Four members of the Education Board were elected.

Judicial retention elections 
One Supreme Court Associate Justice, Katherine A. Maraman, and one Superior Court Judge, Anita A. Sukola, were up for retention.

References

External links
Official campaign websites
Leevin Camacho (I) for Attorney General
Douglas Moylan (R) for Attorney General

General elections in Guam
2018 Guam elections